North Henderson Township is located in Mercer County, Illinois. As of the 2010 census, its population was 421 and it contained 186 housing units.  North Henderson Township was originally named Liberty Township, but the name was changed sometime before 1921.

Geography

Demographics

References

External links
City-data.com
Illinois State Archives

Townships in Mercer County, Illinois
Townships in Illinois